European Parliament elections were held in the Czech Republic on 23 and 24 May 2014. In total, 21 Members of the European Parliament were elected using proportional representation (single district D'Hondt with a 5% threshold).

ANO won the election closely followed by the coalition of TOP 09 and STAN, themselves closely followed by ČSSD. A total of 7 parties gained seats, including the non-parliamentary Party of Free Citizens. Election turnout was 18.2%, the second lowest of all participating countries after Slovakia.

Campaign finances

Opinion polls

Results

European groups

Elected members

The seats were given out within the parties to the candidates who received the preference votes, if number of preference votes exceeds 5% of votes for party (highlighted by bold), otherwise to the candidates by its order on party candidate list. 8 of 21 elected candidates are non-partisans (4 elected for ANO, 3 for TOP 09 and STAN and 1 for ČSSD).

ANO 
Pavel Telička – 50,784 votes
Petr Ježek – 5,301 votes
Dita Charanzová   – 8 356 votes
Martina Dlabajová – 4,789 votes

TOP 09 and STAN
Jiří Pospíšil – 77,724 votes
Luděk Niedermayer – 37,171 votes
Jaromír Štětina – 18,951 votes
Stanislav Polčák – 11,997 votes

ČSSD
Jan Keller – 57,812 votes
Olga Sehnalová – 10,955 votes
Pavel Poc – 3,818 votes
Miroslav Poche – 3,692 votes

KSČM
Kateřina Konečná – 28,154 votes
Miloslav Ransdorf – 14 384 votes
Jiří Maštálka – 11,525 votes

KDU-ČSL
Michaela Šojdrová – 22,220 votes
Pavel Svoboda – 21,746 votes
Tomáš Zdechovský – 5,063 votes

ODS
Jan Zahradil – 19,892 votes
Evžen Tošenovský – 16,514 votes

Svobodní
Petr Mach – 13,211 votes

Aftermath
The Green Party and Pirate Party failed to reach 5% threshold. Both parties decided to deliver a complaint to Supreme Administrative Court. They were inspired by Germany, where the threshold was abolished. The court did not decide about the complaint and sent it to the Constitutional Court. Constitutional Court rejected the complaint on 1 June 2015. According to the court, abolishing the threshold would lead to less effective European Parliament as it would be fragmented too much.

If the threshold was abolished for 2014 elections Green Party and Pirate Party would get 1 MEP. Social Democrats and Christian Democrats would have 1 MEP less on the other hand.

References

Czech Republic
European Parliament elections in the Czech Republic
2014 elections in the Czech Republic